Paul Munanjala professionally known as Paul Da Prince is a Zambian-born musician, TV and Radio presenter, DJ, Master of Ceremonies based in Windhoek, Namibia. He first rose to fame in 2007 after taking part in a singing competition on Muvi TV's Teen Star program.

Early and personal life
Paul was born on 8 December 1991 in Zambia's Copperbelt town of Mufulira. He grew up in Lusaka and attended primary school at the Gospel Outreach Christian Academy (GOCA) and Mount Jebica primary and secondary school. He has expressed his admiration for singers Usher, NSYNC, Boyz II Men, Omarion, Chris Brown, Ne-Yo and Trey Songz. He joined the Muvi TV team in 2011, learning how to produce and present television content. He studied for a certificate in camera operations at TEVETA in 2010. He also studied a diploma in Hardware and Network Engineering from 2010 to 2011. Paul went on to pursue his media degree at the University of Namibia in 2012, graduating four years later in 2016 with an honors degree in Media and Drama.

Music career

Paul recorded his first single in 2009 titled 'She's my lady' produced by Daxon of Ma Africa. He went on to collaborate with Ruff Kid in 2010 on a song titled 'Boss Lady'. This gained airplay on local radio stations. He went on to record his debut album in Windhoek in 2015, working with Namibian artists, including: Floritha, Bertholdt, KP Illest, Adora, Oteya, K'Chinga (Zambia), T.R.E (UK), Solomon YT (Nigeria) and Anthony Faulkner (USA).

Entertainment

Paul is prominent for his role as a TV presenter and master of ceremonies. Having worked with Muvi TV in his teenage years on shows like Z-Kids News, Michael Jackson Dance Show and the Kids and Teens show between 2008 and 2012. He currently works with the Namibian Broadcasting Corporation as the host of the weekly entertainment show 'Whatagwan' and hosts a breakfast show on NBC's National FM every weekday. He has hosted various high-profile events including the Trey Songz Concert in 2015, the Namibian Annual Music Awards in 2015, 2016, 2017, 2018 and 2019. He guest-hosted SuperSport and Mzanzi Magic's weekly sports and entertainment show which is hosted by Minnie Dlamini and Lungile Radu in September 2018. He also worked on two seasons of 'Kumwesu' which is a lifestyle and entertainment programme which aired on Zambezi Magic between 2017 and 2018.

Awards and nominations

References

External links
Official Instagram

1991 births
Living people
People from Lusaka
People from Windhoek
Zambian musicians